The Wolf of Gubbio is an 1877 oil on canvas painting by Luc-Olivier Merson, dedicated to his former student, collaborator and friend Adolphe Giraldon and exhibited at the Paris Salon of 1878. It was acquired by its present owner, the Palais des Beaux-Arts de Lille, in 1881. It is inspired by a legend of Francis of Assisi and the wolf of Gubbio in Italy.

References

French paintings
1877 paintings
Paintings in the collection of the Palais des Beaux-Arts de Lille
Wolves in art
Birds in art
Paintings of children